A versatackle is a self-locking tensioning structure implemented in cordage. It consists of two loops with the rope passed back and forth between them. It is functionally similar to the trucker's hitch; however, unlike the trucker's hitch, the versatackle is self-locking under tension.

The pressure, friction, and heat that may be generated by the running end moving through the loops can accelerate wear at the loops.

Step-by-step images

See also
 List of knots

External links
Versatackle knot

References

Knots